The bichuwa or bichawa is a dagger, originating from the Indian subcontinent,  with a loop hilt and a narrow undulating sharp blade. It is named for its resemblance to the sting of a scorpion, for which the Hindi name is bichuwa. The weapon was based on the maduvu, or horn dagger created in South India, and many bichuwa have blades which retain the shape of buffalo horns. Early examples of the bichuwa come from the medieval southern  Karnataka empire of Vijayanagara. Being relatively easy to make, the bichuwa has persisted into the 20th century as a decorative dagger.

Construction and use 
The bichuwa usually has a narrow recurved blade and a simple looped handle which may be cut with chevrons. It generally measures just over 30 centimetres. The handle sometimes loops into a knuckleguard. The all-metal hilt is often cast in one piece. Medieval bichuwa from south India are typically decorated with the face of a protective yali (demon) on the hilt. Some have finials to the pommel or even protruding laterally as quillons or guards. A few bichuwa are forked or even double-bladed.

The weapon's small size meant it was easily concealed in a sleeve or waist band. A bichuwa was often combined with a bagh naka, either with the claws being added to the hilt of the bichuwa, or the blade being added to one of the finger loops of the bagh nakha. The former type tended to be larger than the latter. This combination weapon, known as a bichuwa bagh naka, was used by the Maratha King Shivaji to assassinate Afzal Khan in the 17th century. Shivaji's weapon was named Bhawani or "life-giver", though some accounts suggest that this was the name of his sword.

See also
Bagh nakha

References 
 George Cameron Stone: A Glossary of the Construction, Decoration, and Use of Arms and Armor in All Countries and In All Times (1934)

Weapons of India
Indian melee weapons
Daggers
Blade weapons